Həzi Aslanov is a village in the municipality of Köçvəlili in the Agstafa Rayon of Azerbaijan. The village is named after Azi Aslanov, a Soviet military leader.

References

Populated places in Aghstafa District